École secondaire de la Cité-des-Jeunes, previously named École secondaire Vaudreuil  is a public high school in Vaudreuil-Dorion, Quebec, Canada. Managed by the Commission scolaire des Trois-Lacs, it serves the northern population of the peninsula of the regional county municipality of Vaudreuil-Soulanges.

History 
The school was founded during the Quiet Revolution of Quebec by the deputy of Vaudreuil-Soulanges and Minister of Education Paul Gérin-Lajoie with creating a place where everything would be accessible for students in mind. In fact, it is not just a school, but a whole campus that was built: a high school, a trade school, a building for adults continuing education, a pool and an arena. The school is the birthplace of the education reform and one of the first polyvalantes created in Quebec. The campus is still, to this day, the vastest in the province in terms of land. Previously known as École secondaire Vaudreuil and then École secondaire de la Cité-des-Jeunes, the school picked its current name in 2004. An English school (Vaudreuil High School) used to be in the current Paul-Gérin-Lajoie buildings. It is now used for adults in continuing education. Previously, Pavilion Vaudreuil (the northernmost building on campus) was divided into two sections: one for boys, Salle G (garçons, or boys) and Salle F (filles, or girls) which were used in between classes. There was previously a baseball field that was destroyed to build Brind'Amour, which, unlike the rest of the campus, is a primary education establishment. The football field was the closest thing to a replacement for the destroyed baseball field.

In 2019, the high school witnessed minor flooding throughout the months of April and May.

Campus 
Buildings:

 École secondaire de la Cité-des-Jeunes
 Vaudreuil Pavilion (1st, 2nd, 4th and 5th years of high school)
 Lionel-Groulx Pavilion (3rd year of high school and EHDAA)
 Cultural Center
 Library
 Cafeterias
 Theaters 
 Infirmary
 Belles Rives Center
 Music classes
 etc.
 Sports Center
 Paul Gérin-Lajoie Training Center
 Brind'Amour
 Pool
 Water Treatment School

Institutions:

 Commission Scolaire des Trois-Lacs Administrative Center
 École secondaire de la Cité-des-Jeunes
 Trois-Lacs Multicenter
 Paul Gérin-Lajoie Training Center
 Belles Rives Center (General Education to Adults)
 The Administrative Office of Services to Enterprises
 Municipal Pool
 Municipal Arena

Statistics 
As of 2018, École secondaire de la Cité-des-Jeunes teaches 2874 students and Brind'amour teaches 517, for a total of 3391 students on the campus based on available data.

Sports 
The school sport teams have Citadins de la Cité-des-Jeunes as a name. Their most popular sports are football, volleyball, and badminton. The ice hockey and swimming teams also use a public arena and indoor swimming pool which are located on the school’s campus.

See also

References

External links

École secondaire de la Cité-des-Jeunes (School website. French only.)
Commission Scolaire des Trois-Lacs (School board website. French only.)
The Cité-des-Jeunes Foundation (French only.)

Related articles 

 Commission Scolaire des Trois-Lacs (French/English)
 Collège Bourget (French/English)

(English versions for both of these are incomplete.)



Vaudreuil-Dorion
High schools in Montérégie
High schools in Quebec